The following is a list of miniseries produced by RecordTV.

1990s

2010s

References

Record